LivePlanet was a production company founded in 2000, and was known for television and new media platforms.

History
It was created by Ben Affleck, Matt Damon, Chris Moore and Sean Bailey. Affleck and Damon ended their film production deal in late 2007, and Bailey disassociated in 2008 to form Ideology Inc., his own film production company for The Walt Disney Company.

Filmography
American Pie 2 (2001)
Joy Ride (2001)
Project Greenlight (2001)
Push, Nevada (2002) (TV)
The Emperor's Club (2002)
Third Wheel (2002)
Speakeasy (2002)
Stolen Summer (2002)
Matchstick Men (2003)
The Battle of Shaker Heights (2003)
American Wedding (2003)
All Grown Up (2003) 
Project Greenlight 2 (2003)
Surviving Christmas (2004)
Tricks of the Trade: Making 'Matchstick Men (2004) (Documentary)
Feast (2005)
Project Greenlight 3 (2005)
The Entertainer (TV show) (2005) (Reality show)
Fan Club: Reality Baseball (2006)
Gears of War: The Race to E3 (2006) (Made for TV movie)
Gone Baby Gone (2007)
 Finish Our Movie (2007)
Running the Sahara (2007)

Released though Sean Bailey's film studio Ideology Inc.
Tron: Legacy (2010) (with Walt Disney Pictures)

References

External links

Entertainment companies established in 2000
Film production companies of the United States
Matt Damon
Ben Affleck